The Aluphone is a tuned percussion instrument consisting of aluminum bells that are struck with a mallet to produce musical tones.  In its standard configuration, the bells of the Aluphone are mounted on a frame, but it can also be played as a single handheld bell or as a stack of bells.  The bells of the Aluphone are very durable, so they can be struck with a large variety of mallets, wands, or hammers depending on the tone that the musician seeks to produce.

The Aluphone is closely associated with Evelyn Glennie, who played the instrument in the opening ceremony of the 2012 Summer Olympics.

History 
According to Harry Ellis, the idea for the Aluphone was developed at a trade show that two men, Michael Hansen and Kai Stensgaard, were separately attending.  At the trade show, Hansen was showcasing aluminum cones that were designed to protect the tops of wooden posts.  As a musician, Stensgaard was curious about the sound the cones would make when he struck.  He was impressed with the tone created by the metal cones when struck and asked if Hansen could produce cones that would produce an assortment of unique pitches that could be incorporated into a playable instrument.  Hansen agreed to work with Stensgaard on the project.  In 2011, Stensgaard presented the Aluphone for the first time at PASIC, a convention held by the Percussive Arts Society.

In an interview, Glennie stated that she was not involved in the creation of the original Aluphone.  After becoming interested in the instrument, she worked with Hansen and Stensgaard to develop a new version of the Aluphone, sometimes called the Glennie Aluphone, for her to play at an upcoming performance of Caliban's Dream at the 2012 Summer Olympics.

Stensgaard presented the Aluphone at PASIC again in 2013.  Stensgaard stated: "A lot of people know the instrument now and really like the sound. Composers are writing for it."

Adam Schoenberg made use of the Aluphone in a 2013 orchestral composition called Bounce. He believes that it was the first time that original music was composed for the Aluphone in an orchestral arrangement.

Anders Koppel Concerto for Aluphone and Symphony Orchestra. Soloist plays aluphone and marimba. World Premier January 16 and 17, 2014 with Evelyn Glennie as the soloist. Written for Aluphone Glennie Concert 2 1/2 oct.  Listen here. You can get the music from Edition Wilhelm Hansen: score – solo part

James MacMillan “Percussion Concerto No.2” Premiere by Colin Currie, November 7, 2014, Netherlands Radio Philharmonic Orchestra with James Gaffigan at the Muziekcentrum Vredenburg (Utrecht)

Oriol Cruixent “Oraculum” Op.72 (Latin, m., literally: oracle) is a Concerto for Multi-Percussion and Orchestra in seven parts. Oriol Cruixent has composed and dedicated “Oraculum” to the percussionist Vivi Vassileva, with whom he has a long-standing musical friendship. World premiere May 19, 2019

Mark Bowden  Heartland, percussion concerto with Symphony Orchestra. Percussion part includes Aluphone Glennie Concert. Premier by BBC Wales May 15, 2013. Soloist Julian Warburton Conductor: Grant Llewellyn. Recorded in January 2013 by BBC National Orchestra of Wales.

Max de Wardener Percussion Concerto with Symphony Orchestra: Percussion part includes Aluphone Glennie Concert. World premier June 19, 2013 in L´Auditorium de Bordeaux with Collin Currie as soloist.

Glennie played the Aluphone again in a 2015 performance of Dithyrambs at Cadogan Hall, receiving favorable reviews.  She struck the bells of the Aluphone in a variety of ways to produce sounds ranging from those of a glockenspiel to that of a gong.

Kai Stensgaard  Concerto for Aluphone & marimba with Symphony Orchestra 2020. 3 movements. Duration 20 minutes.

Salvador Rojo Four Forces for percussion soloist & Orchestra 26:00. Premiered by Victor Segura Raga and Orquesta de extremadura. 1, movement for Aluphone & vibraphone.

Askell Másson Capriccio for Darabuka & Orchestra. October 22, 2017 World Premiere. Iceland – Akureyri Hof Concert House. Sinfonia North, Askell Masson (Darabuka), Petri Sakari (cond.)

Francisco Coll Mural was premiered by www.philharmonie.lu September 2016. The percussion section included an aluphone.

References

External links 
Aluphone – Tuned percussion for percussionists – Official website sponsored by the creators of the Aluphone
BBC Music – Excerpt of Evelyn Glennie playing a Concerto for Aluphone with the Odense Symphony Orchestra.
PASIC 2011 – Aluphone – YouTube video of Kai Stensgaard playing the Aluphone at PASIC 2011.
James MacMillan – Aluphone – YouTube video of Colin Currie playing the Aluphone.
Santa Clara Vanguard – Aluphone – YouTube video of Santa Clara Vanguard playing the Aluphone at PASIC.
www.aluphone.com

Pitched percussion instruments
Metal percussion instruments
Orchestral percussion instruments
Keyboard percussion instruments